Albert Wyckmans (12 September 1897 – 20 June 1995) was a Belgian cyclist. He won the bronze medal in the Team road race in the 1920 Summer Olympics.

References

External links
 
 

1897 births
1995 deaths
Belgian male cyclists
Olympic cyclists of Belgium
Olympic bronze medalists for Belgium
Cyclists at the 1920 Summer Olympics
Olympic medalists in cycling
Cyclists from Antwerp
Medalists at the 1920 Summer Olympics